The SVO Germaringen is a German association football club from Germaringen, Bavaria.

The club's most successful era was the 1970s and early '80s, when it played in the tier-four Landesliga Bayern-Süd. More notable however is its qualification to the first round of the DFB-Pokal in this time. Qualified on three occasions, it advanced to the second round in 1976, beating fellow amateur side VfR Laboe 9–0.

Apart from football, the club has another seven sports departments, like tennis and line dance.

History

Football was first played in organised form in Germaringen in the early 1920s, but it took until 1930 for a club to be formed, the Spielvereinigung Obergermaringen. The club, in its early days, had 32 members.

The club experienced some local success and, by 1935, reached the local Kreisliga, where it played against teams from Landsberg am Lech, Thannhausen, Mindelheim and Krumbach. With the outbreak of the Second World War, the senior team had to be withdrawn but a junior side was still successful in 1940, winning a local championship. From this side, ten of the eleven players did not return from the war.

The side was reformed in 1946 and re-entered competitive football in the local amateur leagues. In 1957, the club earned promotion to the A-Klasse, where it would play until 1971. In this era, the club's youth teams were more successful, earning to runners-up finishes in the Schwaben championship.

In 1971, the team achieved promotion to the tier-five Bezirksliga Schwaben-Süd. It stayed in this league for only two seasons before earning another championship and moving up to the Landesliga Bayern-Süd.

In its first season there, the team finished in twelfth place, nine points clear of a relegation rank. For the duration of its league membership, the club finished in the lower half of the table, but nevertheless survived there for eight seasons. In 1980, a seventeenth place however meant relegation.

In 1976, the team reached the final of the Schwaben Cup for the first time, losing 3–2 to FC Memmingen. It then beat SV Brunnthal 3–2 to qualify for the first round of the DFB-Pokal for the first time. There, the team defeated fellow amateur side VfR Laboe 9–0, a result more common in games between professional and amateur sides. In the second round of the Cup it lost 6–0 to Arminia Bielefeld.

The club returned to the Schwaben Cup final in 1978, where it lost to SSV Glött on penalties. Qualified for the first round of the DFB-Pokal once more, the team went out to VfR Bürstadt after a 7–1 loss.

The club made a third appearance in the national cup competition when it won the Schwaben Cup with a 2–1 over TSV 1861 Nördlingen in 1982 and then qualified after defeating SV Bütthard 4–1. It met Hammer SpVgg in the first round of the DFB-Pokal and lost 2–1.

The team made a return to the Landesliga in 1983. It achieved its best-ever finish there in the following season, coming eighth. This time around, the club only lasted for three seasons in the league, suffering relegation in 1986. 

When, in 1988, the Bezirksoberligas were formed in Bavaria as the new fifth tier of the Bavarian football league system, SVO managed to qualify for the new Bezirksoberliga Schwaben.

After a fifth place in its first season there, 1989–90 brought almost a return to the Landesliga. Finishing on equal points at the top of the table with TSG Thannhausen, the side lost a decider and then also lost in the following promotion round.

A number of seasons with mid-table finishes followed but, in 1995, the club was relegated back to the Bezirksliga, ironically alongside TSG Thannhausen, and also TSG Augsburg.

After a number of season spend at Bezirksliga level, it returned to the Bezirksoberliga in 1999. In four seasons there, it could not break into the upper half of the table and was relegated back to the Bezirksliga in 2003, where it still plays as of today.

For the club's 75th anniversary, it invited the 1. FC Nürnberg, who it lost to 8–0 in front of 1,800 spectators.

The club came fourteenth in the Bezirksliga in 2014–15 and was relegated to the Kreisliga for the first time in 45 years.

For the 2017–18 season, the fielded eighteen separate football teams in senior and youth football, one more than in the previous season, and a new club record. SVO has three senior teams in the Schwaben football league system, one in the Kreisliga Alläu Mitte, one in the Kreisklasse  and a third in the B-Klasse. Most clubs in Schwaben only field two senior teams.

Honours
The club's honours:

League
 Bezirksoberliga Schwaben (V)
 Runners-up: 1990
 Bezirksliga Schwaben-Süd (V)
 Champions: (2) 1973, 1983
 Runners-up: 1999

Cup
 Schwaben Cup
 Winners: 1982
 Runners-up: (2) 1976, 1978

Indoor
 Bavarian championship
 Runners-up: 1992
 Schwaben championship
 Winners: 1992
 Runners-up: 1988

Recent seasons
The recent season-by-season performance of the club:
<

With the introduction of the Bezirksoberligas in 1988 as the new fifth tier, below the Landesligas, all leagues below dropped one tier. With the introduction of the Regionalligas in 1994 and the 3. Liga in 2008 as the new third tier, below the 2. Bundesliga, all leagues below dropped one tier. With the establishment of the Regionalliga Bayern as the new fourth tier in Bavaria in 2012 the Bayernliga was split into a northern and a southern division, the number of Landesligas expanded from three to five and the Bezirksoberligas abolished. All leagues from the Bezirksligas onwards were elevated one tier.

Friendlies
The club has played a number of friendlies in the past against top-teams from Europe and South America:
 25 July 1982: Fortuna Düsseldorf 0–0
 28 July 1983: Eintracht Frankfurt 0–3
 25 July 1984: FC Twente Enschede 0–4
 27 July 1984: Arminia Bielefeld 0–3
 24 July 1985: HFC Haarlem 2–4
 17 July 1986: Alkmaar Zaanstreek 0–3
 23 July 1986: VfL Bochum 2–4
 3 July 1987: Ajax Amsterdam 1–1
 4 August 1987: Gremio Porto Alegre 0–4
 22 January 1989: FC Swarovski Tirol 10–4
 13 July 1990: 1. FC Lok Leipzig 1–4
 2 July 2005: 1. FC Nürnberg 0–8
 19 October 2007: FC Bayern Allstars 5–4

DFB-Pokal appearances
The club has qualified for the first round of the DFB-Pokal three times:

Source:

References

External links
Official team site
Das deutsche Fußball-Archiv historical German domestic league tables 

Football clubs in Germany
Football clubs in Bavaria
Association football clubs established in 1930
Football in Swabia (Bavaria)
1930 establishments in Germany